The Thaba Bosiu Armour Regiment (formerly Regiment President Steyn) is a reserve armoured regiment of the South African Army.

History

SADF 1994 Onward 

During Gibson's tenure the Regiment was awarded the “General Winner Personnel Administration” shield consecutively from 1995 to 1997.

On 1 April 1997 Lt Col Gibson handed over command to Lt Col André de Beer when Regiment Vrystaat (RVS) re-joined the Regiment after 21 years.

Name Change
In August 2019, 52 Reserve Force units had their names changed to reflect the diverse military history of South Africa. Regiment President Steyn became the Thaba Bosiu Armour Regiment, and have 3 years to design and implement new regimental insignia.

Regimental symbols
Regimental Colour: The badge is a Vickers machine gun with the arms of the late President Steyn and Floreat above it and the title and Bloemfontein below. The flash is yellow above white with black as the lowest panel, and a black triangle on the centre white.

Previous Dress Insignia

Unit colours
The regiment's first Unit Colour was a gift from the City Council of Bloemfontein and the wife of the late President M.T. Steyn presented it to the Unit on 17 October 1939. The RPS also became the first unit to receive the Right to the Freedom of Entry to the City of Bloemfontein. The date of this honour was 1 April 1955.

Battle honours
 East Africa 1940 – 1941
 Western Desert 1941 – 1943
 Sidi Rezegh
 Gazala
 Alamein Defence
 El Alamein

Operational Duty during the Border War
 South West Africa:
1980 Ruacana: In support of Op Sceptic
1983 Oshivello: Op Robyn
1983 Tsinsabis: Op Phoenix
1988 Oshivello: Op Prone
 Angola:
1987 Op Moduler & Op Hooper
1988 Op Packer

References

South African Army
Armoured regiments of South Africa
Military units and formations in Bloemfontein
Military units and formations established in 2019
Military units and formations of South Africa in the Border War